Donald Gregg (17 September 1924 – 26 September 2012) was an Australian cricketer. He played fifteen first-class matches for South Australia between 1954 and 1957.

References

External links
 

1924 births
2012 deaths
Australian cricketers
South Australia cricketers
People from Tumby Bay, South Australia
Cricketers from South Australia